Jiří Heller is a Czech sprint canoeist who competed in the mid-2000s. He won a gold medal in the C-4 200 m event at the 2006 ICF Canoe Sprint World Championships in Szeged.

References

Czech male canoeists
Living people
Year of birth missing (living people)
ICF Canoe Sprint World Championships medalists in Canadian